The Q Hall of Fame Canada is a national resource dedicated to house and commemorate the diverse history of the lesbian, gay, bisexual and transgender community in Canada. They honour those that have been human rights pioneers and document the accomplishments and lives of these people.  Headquartered in Vancouver, British Columbia, the Q Hall of Fame is an independently registered federal not for profit organization with the Minister of Industry for Canada.

The Q Hall of Fame Canada was created in 2009 by founder and chair Paul Therien.  It was in response to what he perceived to be a lack of recognition for people who have greatly impacted the lives of LGBTQ Canadians through their dedication to human rights.  It is an independent entity and is not associated directly with Qmunity in governance or management. At the inaugural induction ceremony for the Q Hall of Fame, known as Q Ball, Qmunity was the "selected beneficiary" of the 2009 proceeds and "a possible future home of the hall's memorabilia", however a recent shift in the mandate of the Hall of Fame has amended that.  

Inductees for the Q Hall of Fame are selected through a public nomination process. Nominees are usually members of the LGBT community themselves, although heterosexual allies who have played prominent roles in the protection or advancement of LGBT equality rights in Canada — such as former Prime Minister Pierre Trudeau — may also be honoured. 

At the 2009 induction ceremony, entertainer Robert Kaiser (also known as Joan-E) was the first inductee into the Hall of Fame, and he was followed by Olympic gold medalist Mark Tewksbury, head of the Canadian Drag Court Ted Northe, author and bookseller Janine Fuller and former Prime Minister Pierre Trudeau, for his role in decriminalising homosexuality in Canada. 

Held every two years, Q Ball was held in Vancouver in 2009, and again in 2011.  In 2013 Q Ball will be held in Toronto, in keeping with the mandate that the event be accessible to all Canadians. All nominations are reviewed by an independent selection committee which comprises community members from across Canada. The identities of the members of the selection committee are kept strictly confidential to ensure that they remain as unbiased as possible when reviewing the nominations.

Inductees

2009
Janine Fuller
Robert Kaiser
Ted Northe
Mark Tewksbury
Pierre Trudeau

2011
Rick Bébout
Karen Busby
Jeremy Dias
Dogwood Monarchist Society
Gens Hellquist
k.d. lang
Kevin Dale McKeown
NiQ
Cynthia Petersen
Mirha-Soleil Ross
Delwin Vriend
Garth Wiens

2013
Jack Layton
Marie Robertson
Jane Rule
Barbara Snelgrove
Darrin Hagen
Rev. Brent Hawkes
Harold Desmarais

See also 

LGBT rights in Canada

References

External links 

 Q Hall of Fame Canada
 Q Foundation

LGBT organizations in Canada
2009 establishments in British Columbia
Non-profit organizations based in Vancouver
LGBT culture in Vancouver
LGBT museums and archives
Halls of fame in Canada
LGBT-related awards
LGBT halls of fame